Bopomofo Extended is a Unicode block containing additional Bopomofo characters for writing phonetic Min Nan, Hakka Chinese, Cantonese, Hmu, and Ge. The basic set of Bopomofo characters can be found in the Bopomofo block.

Block

History
The following Unicode-related documents record the purpose and process of defining specific characters in the Bopomofo Extended block:

See also 
 Spacing Modifier Letters (Unicode block) has two Bopomofo characters: U+02EA–U+02EB

References 

Unicode blocks